The following is a list of past and present operators of the Douglas DC-8 including those airlines which flew converted Super DC-8-71 and Super DC-8-73 aircraft:

♠ - Denotes original DC-8 operators

Civil operators

 Austrian Airlines

 Belgian International Air Services
 CargoLion
 Delta Air Transport
 Pomair

 BETA Cargo (fleet included converted Super DC-8-73 aircraft)
 Panair do Brasil
 Skymaster Airlines
 Transportes Charter do Brasil
 Varig
 VASP (fleet included former Air Canada Cargo Super DC-8-73 aircraft)

 Air Canada (fleet included converted Super DC-8-73 aircraft operated by Air Canada Cargo)
 Canadian Pacific Airlines ♠  (later renamed CP Air)
 Minerve Canada
 Nationair Canada
 Nordair (fleet included converted Super DC-8-71 aircraft)
 Points of Call Airlines
 Quebecair
 Swiftair Cargo
 Trans-Canada Airlines ♠ (became Air Canada)
 Worldways Canada

 Cayman Airways

 Air Centrafrique

Air Ceylon

 Fast Air
 LanChile Cargo (fleet included converted Super DC-8-71 aircraft)

 Tampa Cargo (fleet included converted Super DC-8-71 aircraft)

 Air Zaïre

 Air Afrique ♠

 Cubana

 Cyprus Airways

 Trans Air Cargo Service
 Hewa Bora Airways
 Kinshasa Airways

 Scanair
 Sterling Airways

 Finnair
 Kar-Air
 Spear Air

 Aéromaritime
 Air France
 Aire d'Evasions (fleet included converted Super DC-8-73 aircraft)
 Minerve (fleet included converted Super DC-8-73 aircraft)
 Point Air
 Transports Aériens Intercontinentaux (TAI)  ♠
 Union Aéromaritime de Transport (UAT) ♠
 UTA ♠

 Atlantis ♠
 Condor (fleet included converted Super DC-8-73 aircraft)
 German Cargo (fleet included converted Super DC-8-73 aircraft)
 Lufthansa
 Lufthansa Cargo (fleet included converted Super DC-8-73 aircraft)
 Südflug

 Airlift International Air Charter Express
 Ghana Airways
 Johnsons Air
 Meridian Airways
 MK Airlines

 Icelandair
 Loftleidir (DC-8 aircraft also operated by subsidiary International Air Bahama)

 Air India

 Garuda Indonesia

 Aer Turas
 Translift Airways (fleet included converted Super DC-8-71 aircraft)

 Alitalia ♠
 Aeral

 Air Jamaica

 Japan Air Lines ♠
 Japan Asia Airways

 African Safari Airways
 Kenya Airways
 Ribway Cargo Airlines (fleet included converted Super DC-8-73 aircraft)

 Liberia World Airways

 United African Airlines

 Cargolux

 Maldives Airways

 Aeroleón
 Aeroméxico
 Aerotransportes Mas de Carga, Mas Air
 Aeronaves de Mexico  ♠
 Aeropostal Cargo de México
 Mexicana de Aviación
 Transportación Aérea Mexicana (TAM)

 KLM ♠  (fleet included mixed passenger/freight DC-8 combi aircraft)
 Martinair

 Air New Zealand ♠
 Southern World Airlines
 TEAL

 Trans Sahel Airlines

 Pakistan International Airlines (Fleet included of 1 leased DC-8-21F and 1 leased DC-8-71CF for cargo flights)

 Air Panamá Internacional
 Arrow Cargo Panamá
 International Air Panamá (INAIR Panamá)

 Líneas Aéreas Paraguayas (LAP) (fleet included converted Super DC-8-71 aircraft)

 Aerolíneas Peruanas (APSA)
 Aeronaves del Perú
 AeroPerú
 APISA Air Cargo
 Faucett

 Philippine Airlines ♠

 Lot Polish Airlines (one Super DC-8-62 leased from Arrow Air in 1987-1988 for servicing the transatlantic line after the loss of one Il-62M)  
 Scandinavia (Denmark, Norway, Sweden)
 Scandinavian Airlines System ♠

Saber Air

African International Airways

Korean Air

 Air Cargo Spain
 Air Spain
 Aviaco
 Cargosur
 Cygnus Air (fleet included converted Super DC-8-73 aircraft)
 Iberia ♠
 Spantax

 Expo Aviation (FitsAir)

 Surinam Airways

 African International Airlines

 Air Sweden (founded as Time Air Sweden.  Fleet included converted Super DC-8-71 and Super DC-8-73 aircraft)
 Interswede

 Balair
 SATA Société Anonyme de Transports Aérien Genève
 Swissair ♠
 Brisair
 
 Air Siam
 Thai Airways

 Birgenair Bravo Cargo Services

 British Cargo Airlines
 IAS Cargo Airlines
 Transmeridian Air Cargo

 ABX Air
 Airborne Express
 Airlift International ♠
 Air Marshall Islands (operated a mixed passenger/freight DC-8-62 combi aircraft)
 American Flyers Airline ♠
 American International Airways
 Arrow Air (fleet included converted Super DC-8-73 aircraft)
 Astar Air Cargo (previously operated as DHL Airways.  Fleet included converted Super DC-8-73 aircraft flying for DHL)
 Air Transport International (ATI) (fleet included converted Super DC-8-71 and Super DC-8-73 aircraft)
 BAX Global (fleet included converted Super DC-8-71 aircraft)
 Braniff International Airways ♠
 Capitol International Airways ♠
 Challenge Air Cargo (fleet included converted Super DC-8-73 aircraft)
 Delta Air Lines ♠ (fleet included converted Super DC-8-71 aircraft)
 Eastern Airlines ♠
 Emery Worldwide (fleet included converted Super DC-8-71 and Super DC-8-73 aircraft)
 Evergreen International Airlines (fleet included converted Super DC-8-73 aircraft.  Evergreen also operated a DC-8-73 for Air India Cargo)
 FedEx Express (fleet included converted Super DC-8-73 aircraft formerly operated by Flying Tiger Line)
 Flagship Express (fleet included converted Super DC-8-71 aircraft)
 Flying Tiger Line ♠ (fleet included converted Super DC-8-73 aircraft)
 Gulf Air Transport (renamed Trans Ocean Airways.  Fleet included converted Super DC-8-71 aircraft)
 Hawaiian Airlines
 Kalitta Air (fleet included converted Super DC-8-73 aircraft)
 MGM Grand Air
 National Airlines ♠
 National Airlines (N8) (cargo operator.  Fleet included converted Super DC-8-71 and Super DC-8-73 aircraft)
 Northwest Orient Airlines ♠
 Overseas National Airways ♠
 Pacific East Air
 Pan American World Airways ♠
 Pan American-Grace Airways ♠ (also known as Panagra)
 Rich International Airways
 Samaritan's Purse (currently operates a converted DC-8-72CF aircraft)
 Saturn Airways ♠
 Seaboard World Airlines ♠
 Southern Air Transport (fleet included converted Super DC-8-71 and Super DC-8-73 aircraft)
  Skybus Cargo Charters (currently operates converted Super DC-8-72 and Super DC-8-73 aircraft)
 Trans Caribbean Airways ♠
 Trans Continental
 Trans International Airlines ♠ (also operated as Transamerica Airlines.  Fleet included converted Super DC-8-71 and Super DC-8-73 aircraft)
 United Air Lines ♠ (fleet included converted Super DC-8-71 aircraft)
 UPS Airlines (fleet included converted Super DC-8-71 and Super DC-8-73 aircraft)
 Universal Airlines ♠
 Wien Air Alaska (contract cargo operations for UPS)
 World Airways
 Zantop International Airlines

 PLUNA

 VIASA ♠

 Zambia Airways (fleet included converted Super DC-8-71 aircraft)

Military and government operators Congolese Air Force - One remained in use in late 2016.

 French Air Force

 Government of Gabon (fleet included converted Super DC-8-73 aircraft)

 Spanish Air Force

 Government of Oman (fleet included converted Super DC-8-73 aircraft)

 Peruvian Air Force - (two DC-8-62-CFs purchased in 1982–83 for the Presidential flight.)

 Philippine Air Force

 Royal Thai Air Force - (two DC-8-62AFs acquired in 1982.)' Government of Togo (operated by BTL - Base de Transport de Lomé) 

 NASA (aircraft is a converted DC-8-72)
 United States Navy

Corporate operators
The Douglas DC-8 is and has been operated by corporate operators.
 ORBIS International operated a DC-8 as a flying hospital

References

 "Andean Air Power...The Peruvian Air Force". Air International, May 1988. Vol. 34, No. 5. pp. 224–235, 240.
 Endres, Günter G. World Airline Fleets 1979. Hounslow, UK: Airline Publications and Sales Ltd., 1979. .
 Francillon, Rene J., McDonnell Douglas Aircraft since 1920, Putnam & Company Ltd, 1979, .
 Pocock, Chris. Thailand Hones its Air Defences". Air International'', Volume 31, No. 3, September 1986. pp. 113–121, 168.

DC-8
Operators